Omar Kamal Sayed Abdel Wahed (born 29 September 1993) is an Egyptian professional footballer who plays as a defender for Egyptian Premier League club Future.

Club career
Having played for Al Masry, Kamal joined Egyptian Premier League side Zamalek on a free transfer on 30 August 2021. However, his contract for Zamalek was immediately cancelled and he joined Future FC

International career
He represented Egypt at the 2021 FIFA Arab Cup and the 2021 Africa Cup of Nations.

References

1993 births
Living people
Egyptian footballers
Association football defenders
Ittihad El Shorta SC players
Al Masry SC players
Pyramids FC players
Egyptian Premier League players
2021 Africa Cup of Nations players